Sister Brown (Dutch: Zuster Brown) is a 1921 Dutch silent film directed by Maurits Binger.

Cast

 Marjorie Villis - Joyce Sinclair, zuster Brown
 Rolf Leslie
 Harold French - Roy Chertsey
 Reginald Barton - Vincent Ferguson, dokter
 Louis Chrispijn Jr. - Henry Ferguson
 Willem Hunsche - Priester
 Mien Schmidt Crans - Roy's moeder
 Norman Doxat-Pratt - Robinsons jongere zoon
 Jack Doxat-Pratt - Robinsons oudere zoon
 Elsie Cohen - Zigeunerin (Gypsy)
 Renee Spiljar - Enid
 Marie Spiljar
 Leni Marcus
 Carl Tobi
 Fred Homann

References

External links 
 

1921 films
Dutch silent feature films
Dutch black-and-white films
Films directed by Maurits Binger